The 1954 United States Senate election in West Virginia took place on November 2, 1954. Incumbent Democratic Senator Matthew M. Neely was re-elected to a fifth term in office.

Primary elections
Primary elections were held on May 11, 1954.

Democratic primary

Candidates
Sam B. Chilton, attorney
Homer M. May, school official
Matthew M. Neely, incumbent U.S. Senator
Roy A. Warden, former State Delegate

Results

Republican primary

Candidates
Latelle M. LaFollette, attorney and businessman, Republican candidate for West Virginia's 6th congressional district in 1950 and 1952
Thomas Sweeney, Republican candidate for U.S. Senator in 1940 and 1946

Results

General election

Results

See also 
 1954 United States Senate elections

References

Bibliography
 
 

1954
West Virginia
United States Senate